Kodaira is a city near Tokyo, Japan.

It may also refer to:
 Kodaira (surname)
 6500 Kodaira

See also
 Enriques–Kodaira classification, a classification of complex surfaces
 Kodaira's classification of singular fibers, which classifies the possible fibers of an elliptic fibration